NTFC may refer to:

 National Foreign Trade Council
 NATO Flying Training in Canada